Artuklu District is the central district of Mardin Province in Turkey and encompasses the city of Mardin. The district had a population of 186,622 in 2021.

Creation 
According to the 2012 Metropolitan Municipalities Law (Law No. 6360), all Turkish provinces with a population more than 750000 will become metropolitan municipalities and the districts within the metropolitan municipalities  will be second-level municipalities. The law also created new districts within the provinces in addition to current districts. In March 2019, Abdulkadir Tutaşı was elected mayor. Since August 2019, Hacı Hasan Gökpinar has been the Kaymakam.

Settlements
The district encompasses ninety-one neighborhoods of which twenty-five form the city of Mardin.

Center neighborhoods 

 13. Mart
 Cumhuriyet
 Çabuk
 Diyarbakırkapı
 Eminettin
 Ensar
 Gül
 Hamzabey
 İstasyon
 Kayacan
 Kotek
 Latifiye
 Medrese
 Necmettin
 Nur
 Ofis
 Saraçoğlu
 Savurkapı
 Şar
 Şehidiye
 Teker
 Yalım
 Ulucami
 Yenıkapı
 Yenişehir

Rural neighborhoods 

 Acar
 Ahmetli
 Akbağ
 Akıncı
 Alakuş
 Alımlı
 Ambar
 Aran
 Arpatepe
 Aşağıyeniköy
 Avcılar
 Aytepe
 Bağlıca
 Boztepe
 Buğday
 Cevizlik
 Cevizpınarı
 Çalışlı
 Çağlar
 Çatak
 Çayırpınar
 Çıplaktepe
 Çiftlikköy
 Çukuryurt
 Dara
 Dibektaş
 Elmabahçe
 Düzlük
 Eroğlu
 Eryeri
 Esentepe
 Eskikale
 Gökçe
 Göllü
 Güneyli
 Gürağaç
 Hatunlu
 Haydar
 Hüyüklü
 Kabala
 Karademir
 Konaklı
 Kumlu
 Kuyulu
 Küçükköy
 Nur (Akıncı)
 Ortaköy
 Özlüce
 Sakalar
 Sulak
 Sultanköy
 Tandır
 Tilkitepe
 Tozan
 Yardere
 Yaylabaşı
 Yaylacık
 Yaylaköy
 Yaylı
 Yenice
 Yeniköy
 Yolbaşı
 Yukarıaydınlı
 Yukarıhatunlu
 Yukarıyeniköy
 Yüce

References

Districts of Mardin Province
Mardin Central District